Skyrunner Paramotor Laboratory (often just called Skyrunner) is a Russian aircraft manufacturer based in Pskov and founded in 1996. The company specializes in the design and manufacture of paramotors in the form of ready-to-fly aircraft for the US FAR 103 Ultralight Vehicles rules and the European microlight category.

The company has produced a wide range of paramotors named in English for their attributes, including the Basic,  Booster, Light and the Powerful.

Aircraft

References

External links

Aircraft manufacturers of Russia
Ultralight aircraft
Paramotors
Companies based in Pskov Oblast